The 2007 Mississippi gubernatorial election was held on Tuesday, November 6. Incumbent Haley Barbour was re-elected to serve a four-year term as Governor of Mississippi from January 15, 2008, through January 10, 2012. The Lieutenant Governor of Mississippi is also on the ballot and elected for the same time period.

Republican primary

Candidates
Haley Barbour, incumbent Governor
Frederick Jones

Results

Democratic primary

Candidates
William Compton, teacher
John Arthur Eaves Jr., attorney
Louis Fondren, former Mississippi State Representative, former Mayor of Moss Point
Fred Smith

Results

General election

Polling

Results

See also
State of Mississippi
Governors of Mississippi

References

External links
Haley Barbour for Governor
John Eaves for Governor

Governor
2007
Mississippi
November 2007 events in the United States